Roger Palisses (born 16 January 1961) is a French former rugby league player and coach. He played as centre or as wing.

Career
Formed in both rugby codes, rugby union and rugby league, he concluded his formation with the latter for XIII Catalan, with which he disputed his first senior matches. Outshined by the competition, he decided to join the nearby club Saint-Estève, which he did for the rest of his career. He won the  French Championship in 1989, 1990 and 1993 as well the Lord Derby Cup in 1987 and 1993. Due to his club performances, he is selected several times for the French national team between 1984 and 1991. 

After the end of his playing career, he also became the coach of Saint-Estève with the same success as he also won the French Championship title in 1997 and the Lord Derby Cup in 1994 and 1995. He was also the co-director of the France national teams between 1994 and 2000 alongside Hervé Guiraud.

Honours

As a player
Team honours:
Winner of the French Championship: 1989, 1990 et 1993 (Saint-Estève).
Winner of the Lord Derby Cup: 1987 et 1993 (Saint-Estève).
Runner-up at the French Championship : 1982 et 1992 (Saint-Estève).
Runner-up at the Lord Derby Cup : 1986, 1988 et 1990 (Saint-Estève).

As a coach
Team honours:
Winner of the French Championship : 1997 (Saint-Estève).
Winner of the Lord Derby Cup: 1994 and 1995 (Saint-Estève)
Runner-up at the French Championship: 1995 and 1996 (Saint-Estève)

References

External links
Roger Palisses profile at rugbyleagueproject.com

Living people
AS Saint Estève players
AS Saint Estève coaches
XIII Catalan players
French rugby league players
French rugby league coaches
France national rugby league team players
Rugby league wingers
Rugby league centres
1961 births